Samiuela is a given name. Notable people with the name include:
Samiuela Lousi (born 1991), a New Zealand rugby footballer
Samiuela Tevi (born 1994), an American football offensive tackle
Samiuela ʻAkilisi Pōhiva (1941–2019), former Prime Minister of Tonga

See also
Samuela